"Love Is the Look You're Looking For" is a single written by American country music artist Rose Lee Maphis for American country music artist Connie Smith. Released in December 1972, the song reached #8 on the Billboard Hot Country Singles chart. The song was issued onto Smith's 1973 compilation of the same name. It became Smith's last top ten single on RCA Records. In addition, "Love Is the Look You're Looking for" peaked at #6 on the Canadian RPM Country Tracks chart around the same time.

Chart performance

References 

1972 singles
Connie Smith songs
Song recordings produced by Bob Ferguson (musician)